The list of ship launches in 1721 includes a chronological list of some ships launched in 1721.


References

1721
Ship launches